Colônia Leopoldina is a municipality located in the Brazilian state of Alagoas. Its population is 21,818 (2020) and its area is 287 km².

References

Municipalities in Alagoas